Nashatar Singh Sidhu (born 19 August 1939) is a Malaysian former javelin thrower who competed in the 1964 Summer Olympics and in the 1968 Summer Olympics.

Honour

Honour of Malaysia
  : 
 Member of the Order of the Defender of the Realm (A.M.N.) (1972)

References

1939 births
Living people
Malaysian javelin throwers
Male javelin throwers
Olympic athletes of Malaysia
Athletes (track and field) at the 1964 Summer Olympics
Athletes (track and field) at the 1968 Summer Olympics
Commonwealth Games competitors for Malaysia
Athletes (track and field) at the 1966 British Empire and Commonwealth Games
Asian Games medalists in athletics (track and field)
Athletes (track and field) at the 1966 Asian Games
Athletes (track and field) at the 1970 Asian Games
Asian Games gold medalists for Malaysia
Asian Games bronze medalists for Malaysia
Medalists at the 1966 Asian Games
Medalists at the 1970 Asian Games
Malaysian people of Indian descent
Malaysian male athletes
Southeast Asian Games medalists in athletics
Malaysian people of Punjabi descent
Southeast Asian Games silver medalists for Malaysia
Members of the Order of the Defender of the Realm
Competitors at the 1977 Southeast Asian Games